Jasenka Marohnić (born 19 November 1972 in Zagreb, SFR Yugoslavia) is a former Croatian female basketball player during the 1989 season of the European Championships.

External links
Profile at eurobasket.com

References

1972 births
Living people
Basketball players from Zagreb
Croatian women's basketball players
Centers (basketball)
Mediterranean Games gold medalists for Croatia
Competitors at the 2001 Mediterranean Games
Mediterranean Games silver medalists for Croatia
Competitors at the 2005 Mediterranean Games
Mediterranean Games medalists in basketball